The eleventh edition of the Pan Pacific Swimming Championships, also known as the 2010 Mutual of Omaha Pan Pacific Swimming Championships, a long course (50 m) event, was held in Irvine, California, United States, from August 18–22.

Medal table

By agreement of the charter nations, medals from the 50 m backstroke, breaststroke, and butterfly events would not count towards the official medals standings. These events are not typically swum at the Pan Pacific Championships, but were added to the schedule because the meet served as a qualifying meet for several other large international competitions.

Events 
The swimming program for 2010 had a total number of 42 events (21 each for men and women). The following events were contested:
Freestyle: 50 m, 100 m, 200 m, 400 m, 800 m, 1500 m 
Backstroke: 50 m, 100 m, 200 m
Breaststroke: 50 m, 100 m, 200 m
Butterfly: 50, 100 m, 200 m
Individual medley: 200 m, 400 m
Relay: 4×100 m free, 4×200 m free; 4×100 m medley
Marathon: 10 km

The 50 m butterfly, 50 m backstroke, and 50 m breaststroke events did not count toward the team scores.

Qualifying criteria

Unlike the World Championships and Olympic Games, nations can enter as many people as they like in the preliminaries of each event (in most international meets, only two swimmers from each nation are permitted). However, only two swimmers per nation can qualify for the semi-finals and finals. Prior to FINA's creation of semi-finals in the late 1990s, a total of 3 swimmers per country could qualify for the final and consolation heats of an event, with no more than 2 swimmers per country in a final or consolation.

For relays, each country may enter up to one team in each relay event to swim in the final heat and count toward the team score. Countries may also enter a “B” relay that will swim in a preceding heat. These “B” relays may not score points and are not eligible for medals.  An NOC may enter up to 1 swimmer per sex (2 total), if they have no swimmers meeting any qualifying B standard.

Results

Men's events

Women's events

Participating nations

Notes and references

See also
All-time Pan Pacific Championships medal table
List of Championships Records

External links
Official website of the Pan Pacific Swimming Association
2010 Pan Pacs handbook (PDF)

 
2010
2010 in American sports
2010 in swimming
Pan Pacific Swimming Championships
International aquatics competitions hosted by the United States
Swimming competitions in the United States
Swimming in California
International sports competitions in California
August 2010 sports events in the United States